Hirzel is a German-language surname. Notable people with the surname include:

 Peter Hirzel (born 1939), Swiss cyclist
 Rudolf Hirzel (1846–1917), German classical scholar
 Susanna Hirzel, known as Susette (1769–1858), Swiss painter

German-language surnames